Gary Michael Kirk (born 10 April 1961) is a former English cricketer.  Kirk was a right-handed batsman who bowled and right-arm fast-medium.  He was born in Colchester, Essex.

Kirk made his debut for Suffolk in the 1998 MCCA Knockout Trophy against Norfolk.  Kirk played Minor counties cricket for Suffolk from 1998 to 2002, which included 23 Minor Counties Championship appearances and 17 MCCA Knockout Trophy matches.  He made his List A debut against the Hampshire Cricket Board in the 1999 NatWest Trophy.  He made 8 further List A appearances, the last of which came against Buckinghamshire in the 1st round of the 2003 Cheltenham & Gloucester Trophy, which was held in 2002.  In his 9 List A matches, he took 14 wickets at a bowling average of 21.42, with best figures of 3/16.

References

External links
Gary Kirk at ESPNcricinfo
Gary Kirk at CricketArchive

1961 births
Living people
Sportspeople from Colchester
English cricketers
Suffolk cricketers